is an electric railway company. The headquarters and service areas are located in Takaoka, Toyama, Japan. It operates two city tram lines: the Shinminatokō Line and the Takaoka Kidō Line.

The tram lines originally operated by Kaetsunō Railway were transferred to the newly established Manyosen in 2002.

On July 8, 2020, it received its one millionth passenger.

External links 
  

Companies based in Toyama Prefecture
Railway companies of Japan